The Secondary Education Examination (SEE) is the final examination in the secondary school system of Nepal which is being taken by National Examination Board . National Examination Board upgraded from what was previously known as School Leaving Certificate (SLC).

Every student must take this examination for completing the 10th grade of their study (According to the new Education Act) before they join higher secondary or intermediate level education (12th grade). The SEE examination is said to be scheduled in March of every year. As the new Education Act, 2016 (2073) has been implemented, the SLC examination will be taken place in Grade 12 as a national level examination whereas the examination of Grade 10 will be known as Secondary Education Examination (S.E.E). This new Education Act was implemented from 2017 March with 538,000 students taking it.

Grading System
The following are the details of the old grading system in Nepal which is implemented by the Nepal Government by developing the New Education Act 2073 for class 12.

Note: 
 Scores less than 0.80 GPA are not acceptable anywhere.
 A+ — Including 3.65

The following are the details of the new grading system in Nepal that were revised in the year 2078 BS (Bikram Sambat) for class 10. 

Note: 
 Scores less than 1.60 GPA are not graded.
 A+ — Including 4.0

See also
 District Level Examination
 National Examination Board
 Education in Nepal
 List of schools in Nepal
 List of engineering colleges in Nepal (intake capacity of engineering colleges)

References

External links

School examinations
Education in Nepal